This is a list of defunct airlines of Egypt.

See also

 List of airlines of Egypt
 List of airports in Egypt

References

Egypt
Airlines
Airlines, defunct